The Saxon Class I was a class of steam locomotive operated by the Royal Saxon State Railways with a  axle arrangement. The engines were supplied by various manufacturers for mixed duties.

History 
In 1871, the Royal Saxon State Railways grouped into Class I all those locomotives that had been procured from various manufacturers in the early years of state railway construction in the Kingdom of Saxony. These were all vehicles with a leading carrying axle and two coupled axles. The oldest locomotives of this class were procured in 1847 by the Saxon-Bavarian Railway. The last Class I locomotive was retired in 1887. No museum pieces have survived.

See also 
 List of Saxon locomotives and railbuses

Literature 
 

2-4-0 locomotives
01 (Saxony)
Railway locomotives introduced in 1847
Standard gauge locomotives of Germany
1B n2 locomotives

Passenger locomotives